Hyposmocoma tricincta is a species of moth of the family Cosmopterigidae. It was first described by Lord Walsingham in 1907. It is endemic to the island of Hawaii.

External links

tricincta
Endemic moths of Hawaii